Alphonse Amédée Trémeau de Rochebrune was a French botanist, malacologist and a zoologist. He was born on 18 September 1836 in Saint-Savin, and died on 23 April 1912 in Paris.

Biography
The son of a curator of the Museum of Angoulême, he became a military surgeon and reached the rank of adjutant in 1870. After obtaining his doctorate in 1874, he travelled to Saint-Louis in Senegal.

In 1878, he joined the Muséum national d'histoire naturelle as an assistant in the Laboratory of Anthropology, and then replaced Victor Bertin (1849–1880), as assistant naturalist in the Laboratory of molluscs, worms and zoophytes, after Bertin's death.  He held this post until his retirement in 1911. He addressed, in one hundred fifty publications, to a variety of subjects: from geology to paleontology, botany to malacology. These include his 1860 catalogue of wild flowering plants in the Department of Charente, co-written with Savatier Alexander.

From 1882 to 1883, Rochebrune took part in a scientific expedition to the Southern Ocean and Cape Horn, with the malacologist Jules François Mabille, during which they collected, and later described many new species of molluscs. In 1889, Rochebrune published reports on his extensive research. Much of Rochebrune's subsequent research was on the growth of shellfish.

Rochebrune was also the discoverer of a lamp from the Paleolithic era, in the caves of La Chaire a Calvin in Charente.

Taxa named
The following taxa, currently considered to be valid, were named by Rochebrune.

Eledone microsicya (Rochebrune, 1884)
Leachia (Pyrgopsis) (Rochebrune, 1884)
Leachia rynchophorus (Rochebrune, 1884)
Sepia (Acanthosepion) (Rochebrune, 1884)
Sepia (Doratosepion)(Rochebrune, 1884)
Sepia (Rhombosepion) (Rochebrune, 1884)
Sepia trygonina (Rochebrune, 1884)
Pleurobranchus digueti Rochebrune, 1895

References

Sources 
 Kraig Adler (2007). Contributions to the History of Herpetology. Volume 2, Society for the study of amphibians and reptiles : 389 p. 
 Benoît Dayrat (2003). Les Botanistes et la Flore de France, trois siècles de découvertes. Publication scientifiques du Muséum national d’histoire naturelle : 690 p. 
 Philippe Jaussaud & Édouard R. Brygoo (2004). Du Jardin au Muséum en 516 biographies. Muséum national d’histoire naturelle de Paris : 630 p. 
 :fr:Alphonse Trémeau de Rochebrune

French malacologists
French zoologists
19th-century biologists
Teuthologists
1912 deaths
1836 births